LGBT migration is the movement of lesbian, gay, bisexual, transgender, and queer (LGBT) people around the world and domestically, often to escape discrimination or ill treatment due to their sexuality. Globally, many LGBT people attempt to leave discriminatory regions in search of more tolerant ones.

History

Background 
In many countries in the world, homosexuality and being transgender is criminalized. 69 countries criminalize homosexuality, and at least 5 (and some regions in others) have the death penalty for it. In 47 countries (and some regions in others), individuals are not legally able to change their gender. 37 countries de facto criminalize being transgender, and 13 explicitly criminalize being transgender. 

This criminalization of LGBT individuals has led to an increase in recent decades of the number of LGBT individuals who seek refuge in other countries, who are left with no other choice but to leave their home country.

By region

Oceania

In the early 1900s, homosexuality was also used as a valid reason for deportation in Australia. The nation specifically allowed for homosexual immigration in the 1980s, and same-sex marriage was legalized in 2017. Today, LGBT people still face discrimination in Australian sports, and this contributes to poorer physical, mental, and emotional health in LGBT than those who are able to freely participate in sports without stigma. On the whole, LGBT people in Australia tend to live in inner city areas (as is the case in many countries, as cities are generally considered more gay-friendly), but data collected in Australia and New Zealand shows that LGBT parents are more likely to live in suburban or rural areas. Children of LGBT parents who lived in suburban or rural areas were more likely to have experienced homophobic bullying at school than children of LGBT parents who lived in inner city areas.

North America
In the beginning of the 20th century, homosexuality was considered a mental illness and used to bar homosexuals from immigrating into the United States, and Canada. Canada allowed for homosexual immigration in 1991.

Canada 

Research among LGBT immigrants in Canada shows that support groups specifically designed for African and Caribbean LGBT immigrants have a multitude of benefits, including better mental health, employment, and housing.

United States

In the United States, the Immigration and Nationality Act of 1965 became the first policy to explicitly prevent "sexual deviates" from entering the country, and it also required the Immigration and Naturalization Service (INS) to deport these individuals.

In the United States, judges and immigration officials require that homosexuality must be socially visible in order for sexual persecution to be a viable complaint. Additionally, homosexuality must be a permanent and inherent characteristic to be considered by U.S. immigration officials. Currently, the US Citizenship and Immigration Services (USCIS) will consider LGBT refugee and asylum claims in their immigration courts, but as a result of cumbersome legal processes, LGBT individuals who are applying for asylum often have a difficult time representing themselves properly in court.

Europe

Today, Europe is generally very tolerant of LGBT people, but this also creates a divide between tolerant countries, which are seen as more "civilized" and "western," and homophobic and/or transphobic countries, which are left seeming "backward." Many LGBT refugees seeking asylum in European countries have difficulty proving that they are "queer enough" to be granted asylum. Up until 2010, LGBT asylum seekers were often told to return to their home countries and "be discreet" about their identities.

Great Britain 

Irish LGBT people have been known to migrate to Britain and especially to London where they typically try to find employment and a more accepting social environment. Urban areas and large international cities are often seen as tolerant and sexually diverse, and many already contain established queer communities.

Irish LGBT immigrants often experience vulnerability in the absence of family networks, which is exacerbated in the context of homophobia and sexual discrimination. Legal protection against sexual discrimination in employment was only introduced in the UK in 2003. Even when legislative provisions and support are in place, homophobia continues to make life and the process of migration difficult for queer migrants. Irish immigrants tend to experience racial and ethnic privilege over immigrants from the Caribbean and Africa, but at the same time still face homophobia and transphobia that heterosexual and cisgender immigrants do not.

Uganda

In 2009, the so-called "Kill the Gays" bill was introduced in the Ugandan Parliament which would require the death penalty for homosexuals as well as requiring others to immediately report suspected homosexuals to the authorities. The bill did not pass due to international outcry, but it had strong support among members of the Ugandan Parliament. The passage of the Anti-Homosexuality act in December 2013 prompted many LGBT Ugandans to flee the country, and at least 400 sought refuge in Kenya. UNHCR (the UN Refugee Agency) initially went out of the way to expedite the resettlement process for LGBT Ugandan refugees in Kenya, but after the influx of refugees became prolonged, the burden of aiding the refugees in their resettlement was passed to Kenyan LGBT organizations, who were generally not equipped to handle the refugees' specific needs.

Asia

Israel

Compared to its Middle Eastern neighbors, Israel has more LGBT-supportive policies for Israeli citizens, and it accepts LGBT asylum applicants. Israel ratified the UN Convention and Protocol Relating to the Status of Refugees in 1951, which theoretically gives protection or asylum to anyone with a "well-founded fear of being persecuted" and forbids the deportation of refugees to the country where their lives were initially threatened. This policy has not been explicitly followed by Israel. As a result, Middle Eastern migration of LGBT people to Israel has been seen. However, Israel has a rule against granting asylum to Palestinian LGBT people on the basis that "there is no systematic persecution based on sexual orientation in the Palestinian Authority". 

However, critics point out that the state of Israel has used the issue of gay rights as a way to distract attention from other human rights abuses perpetrated by the state (a practice called homonationalism - pinkwashing when referring to businesses) and revitalize the nation's image in the international community. These critics suggest that, in actuality, Tel Aviv and Israel at large are strongly divorced from the experiences and goals of queer communities across the rest of the MENA region. According to anthropologist Sa'ed Atshan, pinkwashing includes "representing Israel as a gay haven for Israelis, Palestinians, and internationals in order to attract tourism and other forms of solidarity and support".

Nepal and the Philippines 

Most families of  LGBT emigrants from Nepal and the Philippines indicate that,  although most emigrants' families do not approve of their lifestyles, remittance payments (i.e. when the person who left the country sends money back to their family) are a proven aid to breaking down the controversies surrounding their gender and/or sexual nonconformity.

Turkey
Turkey is both a country of origin and a country of asylum for LGBT refugees. The exact number of arriving or fleeing LGBT asylum seekers in Turkey is unknown since the state does not provide migration statistics concerning sexual orientation and gender identity. However, academic researches show that LGBT asylum seekers arrive in Turkey from North and Sub-Saharan Africa as well as the Middle East. LGBT refugees escaping from Turkey established a solidarity group in Austria.

Current trends of migration
Prominent countries known for substantial LGBT emigration include Iran, Iraq, Jamaica, Pakistan, Saudi Arabia, Mexico, and Brazil.

LGBT immigrants are seen frequently to immigrate to Canada, Britain, and the United States. In 1994, U.S. immigration law recognized sexual persecution as grounds for seeking asylum. U.S. president Barack Obama ordered federal agencies to provide asylum for persecuted LBGTQ persons. As of 2008, only Canada, Norway, Iceland, Denmark, the United States, and Switzerland have enacted immigration equality allowing for partner sponsorship.

Data shows nearly 4,400 people sought asylum from 2007 to 2017. But the exact number of LGBT people seeking asylum into the United States is not known as of 2020.

Asylum seekers and immigrants 
Refugees, defined by the United Nations High Commissioner for Refugees (UNHCR), are displaced persons who "owing to a well-founded fear of being persecuted for reasons of race, religion, nationality, membership of a particular social group or political opinion, is outside the country of his nationality, and is unable to, or, owing to such fear, is unwilling to avail himself of the protection of that country." LGBT refugees are those who are persecuted due to their sexuality or gender orientation and are unable to find protection from their home nation. Individuals can seek refugee status or asylum in several different ways: they can register at an U.N. outpost, visit their intended country and a visa and apply once they are in the country, or they can make a report at their official government representation headquarters. Once a claim is filed, the intended country for reallocation evaluates eligibility of asylum requirements.[UNHCR] During meetings to determine eligibility and suitability, applicants face obstacles that can prevent them from making a successful claim.

Navigating the system 
The first obstacle asylum seekers face is navigating the process in applying for refugee status or asylum. Some countries, including the United States, do not offer any legal assistance in making the asylum claim, requiring the applicant to find and fund their own legal representation. Many applicants inside the United States do not get a lawyer during this process and represent themselves. Other countries, such as the United Kingdom, offer legal aid, increasing the number of applicants who have access to legal advice and representation in applying for refugee status or asylum.

While many refugees share the same difficulties navigating the system, LGBT refugees face additional challenges due to the nature of their claim. Communities are built among LGBT refugees and asylum-seekers, leading to a network of advice about how to navigate the system. These networks help share success stories in navigating the system. Agencies funded by the government to resettle and assist refugees and asylum-seekers can offer further, more general assistance. According to Carol Bohmer and Amy Shuman, statistics make it clear that chances of a successful asylum or refugee claim are greatly improved with legal assistance in the United States. Furthermore, the percentage of refugee claims admitted for LGBT claims tend to be lower compared to its heterosexual counterparts.

Refugees also face difficulty in securing housing once their application process is approved. In the United Kingdom, for instance, refugees can face difficulties integrating into neighborhoods, and are faced with gaps in provision, choices of housing options, and on-going support.

Credibility 
Due to the nature of sexuality and gender claims, applicants often encounter issues with the credibility of their stories. Sexuality and gender identification is a private expression that cannot be determined by appearance. In seeking asylum, applicants are expected to prove their sexual or gender orientation as a proof of being a part of a particular social membership. They are also expected to prove that they are in fear of their life. Applicants applying for asylum due to sexual orientation are asked to present an "identity narrative". There are several different credibility obstacles that applicants face during the application process.

According to Neva Wagner, asylum claims in the United Kingdom face a "notorious challenge". Over 98% of sexual orientation claims were denied in the United Kingdom between 2005 and 2009, compared to the 76.5% refusal rating for all asylum applicants. Bisexual claimants face an even greater challenge due to their dual sexuality. In bisexuality claims, claimants must demonstrate that they are at risk for persecution, even if their sexuality allows them to act in a heterosexual manner.

British claimants also require evidence from an "expert witness"--someone with expertise on the country in which the person seeks asylum--and some countries require a medical documentation of physical and psychological harm done. These requirements decrease the credibility of the asylum seeker's own testimony as well as relying on homonationalist ideas to determine who is "queer enough".

Lawyer S Chelvan reported to the Huffington Post that the use of pornographic evidence—individuals taping themselves having sex with same sex partners—has risen due to challenges to credibility of queer claims. Furthermore, immigration officials have refused witnesses for the credibility of queer asylum claims if the witness did not have sex with applicant. Credibility becomes an issue, as many refugees keep their identity as being queer a secret from their own family and friends in order to avoid persecution.

Cultural differences in gender and narratives 
The first step in verifying eligibility for asylum-seekers and refugee applicants is the initial investigation into why asylum is being sought. This is often done through applicant narratives, where the applicant is asked questions about their experiences and are evaluated in how their stories match the eligibility requirements. In the U.K., initial credibility determinations are given great significance. Initial determinations are not reviewable by appeal, and if credibility is examined, initial determinations are given precedence. Retelling their experiences can be traumatic and unaligned with a chronological telling that is expected in Westernized narratives. Some asylum seekers may not identify with any of the accepted terminology in the country to which they migrate, such as "lesbian" or "bisexual". They may understand their experience as more fluid, informed by the standards of queerness in the country from which they emigrated. There is also an inherent gendered expectation in narratives. Rachel Lewis writes that "The racialized, classed, and gendered stereotypes of male homosexual identity typically invoked by asylum adjudicators pose particular challenges to lesbian asylum applicants."

Women face additional obstacles, whether they are lesbians, bisexuals, transsexuals, or heterosexual. Women's narratives of persecution often take place in the home, so the violence experienced by females is often taken less seriously than males. Rachel Lewis argues that same-sex female desires and attraction are often overlooked in the U.K. cases, and applicants face a "lack of representational space within heteronormative asylum narratives for the articulation of same-sex desire." Simply put, lesbian narratives don't fit into the expected picture of an LGBT applicant. Instead, the expectations is for women to be discreet in their affairs to avoid persecution.  Persecution of lesbians can be seen as routine in countries where it is common for women to be raped—every woman then, is at risk of being attacked, and their lesbian identity would not constitute being persecuted for being a part of a social grouping. Women who appear vulnerable because they are openly lesbian or foreign women "in need of rescue from oppressive patriarchal--read third world--cultures" are more likely to be granted political asylum due to sexuality than women who identify as lesbian privately.

Demographics
Many LGBT refugees experienced abuse as children, and though the UN Committee on the Rights of the Child is working to protect LGBT children, there is still significant room for improvement.

See also
 Corrective rape
 Homophobia
 LGBT rights by country or territory
 Same-sex marriage

References

Immigration and LGBT topics
LGBT rights
LGBT studies articles needing attention
Refugees by type